Boronia nematophylla is a plant in the citrus family Rutaceae and is endemic to the south-west of Western Australia. It is a shrub with thin, simple leaves and pale red to purple, four-petalled flowers arranged singly or in small groups in leaf axils.

Description
The eight stamens are woolly hairy. Flowering from June to November.

Taxonomy and naming
Boronia nematophylla was first formally described in 1860 by Ferdinand von Mueller and the description was published in Fragmenta phytographiae Australiae.<ref name="F.Muell.">{{cite book |last1=von Mueller |first1=Ferdinand |title=Fragmenta phytographiae Australiae |date=1860 |publisher=Victorian Government Printer |location=Melbourne |page=100 |url=https://www.biodiversitylibrary.org/item/7219#page/104/mode/1up |accessdate=6 April 2019}}</ref> The specific epithet (nematophylla) is derived from the Ancient Greek words nema meaning "thread" and phyllon meaning "leaf".

Distribution and habitat
This boronia grows in sandy woodland from Collie to Walpole and east to Esperance in the Avon Wheatbelt, Esperance Plains, Jarrah Forest and Warren biogeographic regions of Western Australia.

ConservationBoronia nematophylla'' is listed as "not threatened" by the Government of Western Australia Department of Parks and Wildlife.

References 

nematophylla
Flora of Western Australia
Plants described in 1860
Taxa named by Ferdinand von Mueller